Central Airmen Selection Board was formed as a selection board for Indian Air Force (IAF)  at the New Delhi Air Force Station  (AFND) and was  entrusted with organising recruitment drive, conduct tests and design standard selection policies and procedures for appointing personnel in various positions of the forces .

History and objective 

Central Airmen Selection Board was started  at the New Delhi Air Force Station (AFND) as a selection board  entrusted with conducting recruitment drives through tests and designing uniform selection processes for the appointment of NCs and pilots in  the Indian Air Force (IAF).

Central Airmen Selection Board conducts the written exam across India.

Types of examinations  

Following are the different levels of exam conducted by board for recruiting into ground and flying staff of Indian Air Force.

 Written Exam.
 AFSB exam at test centres:

Branches 

Central Airmen Selection Board has branches in following cities where selected candidates of written exam and requested to report to complete other formalities.

 Dehradun (1 AFSB),
 Mysuru (2 AFSB),
 Gandhinagar (3 AFSB),
 Varanasi (4 AFSB), and
 Guwahati (5 AFSB).

See also 

 Indian Air Force

References

External links 
 Official Website

Indian Air Force